is a Japanese street racing manga series written and illustrated by Shuichi Shigeno. It was serialized in Kodansha's seinen manga magazine Weekly Young Magazine from 1995 to 2013, with the chapters collected into 48 tankōbon volumes. The story focuses on the world of illegal Japanese street racing, where all the action is concentrated in the mountain passes and rarely in cities or urban areas, and with the drifting racing style emphasized in particular. Professional race car driver and pioneer of drifting Keiichi Tsuchiya helped with editorial supervision. The story is centered on the prefecture of Gunma, more specifically on several mountains in the Kantō region and in their surrounding cities and towns. Although some of the names of the locations the characters race in have been fictionalized, all of the locations in the series are based on actual locations in Japan.

Initial D has been adapted into several anime television and original video animations series by OB Studio Comet, Studio Gallop, Pastel, A.C.G.T and SynergySP. A live action film by Avex and Media Asia was released in 2005. Both the manga and anime series were initially licensed for English-language distribution in North America by Tokyopop (2002–2009). However, the anime license has since been picked up by Funimation (now Crunchyroll), while the manga was relicensed by Kodansha USA in 2019.

As of April 2021, Initial D had over 55 million copies in circulation, making it one of the best-selling manga series in history.

Plot

Takumi Fujiwara is a student working as a gas station attendant with his best friend Itsuki. Itsuki is enthusiastically interested in being a street racer. The team he feels closest to and hopes to join is the Akina Speed Stars, whose team leader Koichiro Iketani is also working at the same pump station. Unbeknownst to his colleagues, Takumi helps out his father Bunta as a tofu delivery driver for his father's store before sunrise each morning, passively building an impressive amount of skill of over 5 years behind the wheel of the family car, an aging Toyota Sprinter Trueno (AE86).

Shortly after the story begins, the Red Suns, a highly experienced racing team from Mount Akagi led by Ryosuke Takahashi, challenge the local Speed Stars team to a set of races on Mount Akina. Dispirited after watching the Red Suns' superior performance during a practice run, the Speed Stars expect to lose. Later that night, the Red Suns' #2 driver, Keisuke Takahashi, heading home after the last practice run, is defeated soundly by a mysterious Sprinter Trueno, despite driving a much more powerful Mazda RX-7 (FD3S). An investigation into the identity of the driver leads to Bunta Fujiwara, Takumi's father. While trying to do his best for the team on Mount Akina, Iketani suffers a crash and damages his car and injures himself. He is unable to take part in the race to represent his team. Iketani begs Bunta to help the Speed Stars defeat the Red Suns, and he initially refuses, later relenting to "maybe" show up at the race. At the same time, Takumi asks Bunta if he can borrow the car for a day to take a trip to the beach with a potential girlfriend (Natsuki Mogi), and Bunta seizes the moment by granting permission (plus a full tank of fuel) on the condition that Takumi defeats Keisuke. On the night of the race, the Trueno does not show up, and the Speed Stars enlist a backup driver (Kenji) for the first run. At the last moment before the race starts, the AE86 arrives. Takumi steps out of the car to the bewilderment of the Speed Stars, who were expecting Bunta. He easily defeats Keisuke by utilizing a dangerous "gutter run" technique (putting both the left/right tires into the gutters to prevent centrifugal force pushing the car outward) on the mountain road's hairpin corners.

The Red Suns' embarrassing defeat sets up the plot for the rest of the series: drivers from neighboring prefectures come to challenge Takumi and the "Legendary Eight-Six of Akina" and thus prove themselves as racers. Meanwhile, Takumi, who was considered spacey and disinterested in the world around him, becomes more passionate about racing with every opponent he faces. However, soon Takumi faces a threat in the form of Emperors, a team that uses Mitsubishi Lancer Evolutions. Takumi's old AE86 is no match and he loses to the team's leader, Sudo Kyoichi (Evo III), blowing his engine. The Akagi RedSuns come to the rescue and defeat both Seiji and Kyoichi, thus securing the pride of Gunma's racers. Meanwhile, Bunta replaces the AE86's blown engine with a new one. Wataru Akiyama and Koichiro Iketani help Takumi to figure out why he is unable to control his car. Takumi soon faces graduation, but continues racing. He defeats Kyoichi in a rematch at his home course, the Nikko Irohazaka. He also defeats the son of Bunta's old rival.

Eventually, the plot moves away from Mount Akina as Takumi becomes bored with racing and winning solely on that road. He joins an expedition racing team, Project.D, formed by Ryosuke Takahashi, (also including Keisuke Takahashi) former leader of the disbanded Red Suns and challenges more difficult opponents on their home courses in the pursuit of his dream to be "the fastest driver out there". At one point, impostors in the form of Takumi and Keisuke try to defame Project D, Wataru comes to help and they dispatch the impostors, revealing them in front of the public. Project D races many teams like Team Seven Star Leaf, Team 246, Team Spiral, and Team Sidewinder. It ends spectacularly with a race of two evenly matched drivers, where Takumi blows his engine again, but steps on the clutch and wins the race by rolling backwards over the finish line. He decides to get rid of his car, but in the anime version, he decides to keep it. Ryosuke disbands Project D and Takumi continues delivering tofu with his father's Impreza.

The story of Initial D would be continued in another manga by Shuichi Shigeno, MF Ghost.

Media

Manga

Written and illustrated by Shuichi Shigeno, Initial D was serialized for eighteen years by Kodansha in the seinen manga magazine Weekly Young Magazine from July 17, 1995, to July 29, 2013. Kodansha collected its 719 individual chapters in forty-eight tankōbon volumes, released from November 6, 1995, to November 6, 2013.

In North America, the manga was licensed for English release by Tokyopop (along with the anime series) in 2001. The company changed the names of the characters in the anime edition, and subsequently changed them in the manga to match. These name changes were to reflect the name changes that Sega implemented into the Western releases of the Initial D Arcade Stage video games due to name length limits. Tokyopop also censored the brief scenes of nudity from the original manga. In addition, "street slang" was interlaced in translations. The company released thirty-three volumes from May 21, 2002, to January 13, 2009, before they announced in August 2009 that their manga licensing contracts with Kodansha had expired. In April 2019, ComiXology and Kodansha Comics announced that they had released volumes 1 to 38 digitally, while volumes 39 to 48 were released in July of the same year.

Anime

Avex has released the anime in several parts called Stages. One noticeable feature is that it uses Eurobeat music as background music in race scenes, especially by Italian singers.
 Initial D (referred to retroactively as "First Stage") — 26 episodes (1998)
 Initial D Second Stage — 13 episodes (1999)
 Initial D Extra Stage — 2-episode OVA side-story focusing on Impact Blue (2000)
 Initial D Third Stage — a 104-minute movie (2001)
 Initial D Fourth Stage — 24 episodes (2004–2006)
 Initial D Extra Stage 2 — a 50-minute OVA side-story focusing on Mako and Iketani (2008)
 Initial D Fifth Stage — 14 episodes (2012–2013)
 Initial D Final Stage — 4 episodes (TV), compilation movie (DVD/Blu-ray) (2014)
 New Initial D the Movie - Legend 1: Awakening — feature movie (2014)
 New Initial D the Movie - Legend 2: Racer — feature movie (2015)
 New Initial D the Movie - Legend 3: Dream — feature movie (2016)

The Battle Stages are Musical Films serving as a compilation of the racing action scenes in the preceding series, stripped of all but minimal character dialog and featuring new music.
 Initial D Battle Stage — a 50-minute movie (2002) 
Battle Stage is a compilation of races from the first three series, except for Extra Stage. The battles from First Stage have been reanimated and remastered with the more advanced CGI used in Third Stage, however the character art remains the same. A battle not featured in either the manga or the anime is featured, using the new CGI and old character art.
 Initial D Battle Stage 2 — a 1-hour movie (2007)
Battle Stage 2 is a compilation of races from Fourth Stage with unchanged CGI, even for the hidden battles. It features Keisuke's first two races as part of Project D, as they were not featured in Fourth Stage.
Initial D Battle Stage 3 — (2021)
Battle Stage 3 features every race from Fifth Stage and Final Stage. Unlike the previous two battle stages, it does not feature any new battles, and doesn't feature any character dialogue.
New Initial D the Movie Battle Digest — (2022)
 A recap of the movie trilogy with additional scenes of the characters test driving their cars.

In 1998, Initial D was adapted into an animated television series produced by OB Planning and Prime Direction. The first episode premièred on Fuji TV on April 8, 1998. The initial series ran for 26 weekly episodes with the finale airing on December 5, 1998.

The second series, named "Second Stage", aired from October 14, 1999, to January 20, 2000, with a one-week break over the New Year period. This was followed by animated feature film in 2001 and an OVA documenting all battles from the previous three stages, with the battles from First Stage being re-animated.

Initial D Third Stage was a feature film covering the story arcs between the second and fourth stage, released in Japan on January 13, 2001.

In 2004, Initial D Fourth Stage aired on SkyPerfecTV's pay-per-view service, airing two episodes back-to-back every two months. 24 episodes were made until the final episodes were aired in February 2006.

Following Second Stage in 2000, Initial D Extra Stage was aired as a spinoff to the original series. This story focused on the all-female Impact Blue team of Usui Pass and their point of view of the recent events of Second Stage and the upcoming Third Stage movie. This was followed by Extra Stage 2 in 2008, which look at the relationship between Impact Blue's Mako Sato and Iketani of the SpeedStars (following on from the original side-story in the manga).

Eight years after the release of "Fourth Stage" in 2004, Animax aired "Initial D Fifth Stage". Animax has aired the series on a pay-per-view basis on SKY PerfecTV!'s Perfect Choice Premier 1 channel. The first two episodes aired on November 9, 2012. The rest of the episodes were broadcast two per month till May 10, 2013.

In 2014, "Initial D Final Stage" became the latest installment in the anime series. Animax has aired its first two episodes on a pay-per-view basis on its own brand new ANIMAX PLUS channel, on May 16, 2014, on its new subscription VOD (Video On Demand) service, which allows subscribers to watch all the latest anime series. Initial D Final Stage will start right after where Fifth Stage left off. There are a total of four episodes that makes up this mini stage. The final two episodes were broadcast on June 22, 2014.

Since the anime's original run, Japanese musical group m.o.v.e has performed all of the opening and some ending themes of the series. This followed on from the success of one of their first hits, "Around the World", which was used as the first opening of First Stage. Their latest single to be used in the series is called "Outsoar The Rainbow" and it is used as Final Stage'''s opening. They had another recent unreleased song, "Days". It was played in the finale of "Final Stage".

Like in the manga, Tokyopop change elements of the anime to suit Western audiences. As well as changing the names and used western slang, the company also changed the anime's music from the series' staple eurobeat tracks to originally developed tracks of rap and hip-hop via Stu Levy (DJ Milky), the Tokyopop CEO and an in-house musician.

In 2006, Funimation announced that it would be distributing the DVDs of the anime (since Tokyopop's original distributor went bankrupt). This new distribution was marked by slightly revised packaging and two box sets corresponding to the licensed seasons Tokyopop had dubbed, although the DVDs themselves were exactly the same as the original Tokyopop release.

Tokyopop had completed an English subtitled version of Third Stage, and screened it at the Big Apple Anime Fest on August 29, 2003. This version of Third Stage reportedly retained the original Japanese soundtrack, in contrast to their treatment of the rest of the anime series. This version of the film was never released on DVD, nor was it ever mentioned by Tokyopop past the original announcement.

At the New York Anime Festival 2009, Funimation announced that it would be re-releasing and re-dubbing Initial D: First Stage, Second Stage, Extra Stage, Third Stage, and Fourth Stage. Their release included a brand new English dub and retained the original music from the Japanese in an uncut format. Funimation released the series out of order, with the Third and Fourth Stages releasing before the First and Second Stages. The first Extra Stage was included in the Second Stage box set.

Animated feature film series
In July 2013 it was announced that another feature film titled New Initial D the Movie and a last anime series, Initial D Final Stage, will be produced. The movie is a retelling of the early Stages with a wholly new voice cast and is split into three parts, with the first part released on August 23, 2014, titled Legend 1: Awakening, the second part was released May 23, 2015, titled Legend 2: Racer, the third part released on February 6, 2016, titled Legend 3: Dream.

Games

 Initial D Gaiden — 1998 — Game Boy
 Initial D — 1999 — Sega Saturn
 Initial D — 1999 — PS1
 Initial D: Ryosuke Takahashi's Fastest Typing-theory — 2001 — PS2
 Initial D Arcade Stage / Initial D — 2002 — Arcade (NAOMI 2)
 Initial D Another Stage — 2002 — GBA
 Initial D Arcade Stage Ver.2 / Initial D Ver.2 — 2003 — Arcade (NAOMI 2)
 Initial D Collectible Card Game — 2003 — Collectible Card Game
 Initial D: Special Stage — 2003 — PS2
 Initial D Mountain Vengeance — 2004 — PC 
 Initial D Arcade Stage 3 / Initial D Version 3 — 2004 — Arcade (NAOMI 2)
 Initial D Arcade Stage 4 / Initial D 4 — 2006 — Arcade (Lindbergh)
 Initial D: Street Stage — 2006 — PSP
 Initial D Arcade Stage 4 Limited — 2007 — Arcade (Lindbergh)
 Initial D Arcade Stage 4 Kai — 2008 — Arcade (Lindbergh)
 Initial D Extreme Stage — 2008 — PS3
 Initial D Arcade Stage 5 — 2009 — Arcade (Lindbergh)
 Initial D Arcade Stage 6 AA — 2011 — Arcade (RingEdge)
 Initial D Arcade Stage 7 AAX — 2012 — Arcade (RingEdge)
 Initial D Arcade Stage 8 ∞ (Infinity) — 2014 — Arcade (RingEdge / RingEdge 2)
 Initial D: Perfect Shift Online — 2014 — Nintendo 3DS eShop (free-to-play)
 Initial D Arcade Stage Zero — 2017 — Arcade (Sega Nu2)
 Initial D RPG — Sony Ericsson mobile phoneInitial D Pachislot - 2021 - Arcade
 Initial D The Arcade — 2021 — Arcade (ALLS)

Live-action film

A live-action film based on Initial D was released on June 23, 2005, in Asia. The movie was jointly produced by Japan's Avex Inc. and Hong Kong's Media Asia Group. It was directed by Andrew Lau and Alan Mak, whose credits include the 2002 Hong Kong blockbuster Infernal Affairs. The adaptation featured Taiwanese singer Jay Chou as Takumi Fujiwara and Hong Kong stars Edison Chen as Ryosuke Takahashi and Shawn Yue as Takeshi Nakazato. Despite many changes to the original story, the movie was met with critical acclaim and was nominated for multiple awards, including Best Picture, at the Hong Kong Film Awards and Golden Horse Awards, winning many of them.

Soundtracks
The anime series sold 700,000 soundtrack album units up until 2000. Some of their most famous soundtracks include "Deja Vu", "Gas Gas Gas", and "Running in the 90's", all of which are Eurobeat songs by Italian musicians.

Reception
Commercial reception
As of July 2013, collected tankōbon volumes of the Initial D manga series sold 48million copies. As of April 2021, Initial D had over 55 million copies in circulation.

The Initial D anime series sold over 1million DVD units in Japan up until 2008. Initial D Fifth Stage (2012) sold  home video units, grossing . The Initial D Third Stage anime film grossed  at the Japanese box office. The anime New Initial D the Movie trilogy grossed $2,660,288 at the East Asian box office. The live-action Initial D Hong Kong film grossed  at the worldwide box office.

Critical responseInitial D received praise. The Anime Review rated it A−, with the reviewer calling it "simply the best show I've seen in a long time." Bamboo Dong of Anime News Network rated it B−, stating it "is the first time in a long while since I've been so fired up about a series, so I recommend to everyone to at least check this out." Some fans of Initial D reacted negatively to the Tokyopop's extensive editing and changes made in the English-language version of the manga. Similar reactions were made towards their English dub's script and voice acting, and the removal of the original music from the anime series. Tokyopop said that it was trying to Americanize the series so it could be aired on television, while at the same time keeping the Japanese spirit of the series.

According to Funimation officials, the re-release of the anime has "done well". Reviews of the series note a marked improvement from the Tokyopop iteration, with most complaints leveled against the lack of anamorphic widescreen on the DVDs. Initial D has drawn comparisons to the later Fast & Furious film franchise (debuted 2001), particularly The Fast and the Furious: Tokyo Drift (2006), for which Initial Ds consultant Keiichi Tsuchiya served as a stunt coordinator and stuntman and also made a cameo appearance in the film as a fisherman.

See alsoMF Ghost, another car racing-themed manga series by the same author, connected to Initial D and a follow-up to the seriesWangan Midnight, another car racing-themed manga produced by Michiharu Kusonoki, focusing on highway racing in Tokyo's Bayshore Route.

Notes

References

External links
 Initial D at Kodansha's official site 
 Avex webpage for Initial D 
 Initial D Fifth Stage Official Website - Animax 
 Initial D Arcade Stage Version 3.0 
 Initial D Games Official Website - Sega Initial D Games Official Website - Sega'' 
 North America Premier of the Live-action Initial D film
 

Initial D
1995 manga
1998 anime television series debuts
1999 anime television series debuts
2000 anime OVAs
2001 anime films
2002 anime OVAs
2004 anime television series debuts
2007 anime OVAs
2008 anime OVAs
2012 anime television series debuts
Action anime and manga
Animated television series about auto racing
Anime series based on manga
Avex Group
Coming-of-age anime and manga
Fuji TV original programming
Funimation
Gallop (studio)
Gunma Prefecture in fiction
Kodansha manga
Madman Entertainment anime
Madman Entertainment manga
Manga adapted into films
Motorsports in anime and manga
Seinen manga
Studio Deen
Tokyopop titles